Denmark competed at the 2010 Winter Olympics in Vancouver, British Columbia, Canada. The highest result came in women's curling, where the Danish team finished fifth.

Denmark's only medal at the Winter Olympics came in women's curling in 1998.

Alpine skiing 

Men

Kilsgaard originally finished his first run in 1:26.32 ranked 66th, but was disqualified after his skies were found not to conform with rule B2.1.2, regarding the distance between the ski boot sole and the running surface of the ski.

Women

Biathlon 

Men

Slettemark competes for Greenland on the World Cup, but since Greenland does not have an NOC, he competes for Denmark during the Olympics.

Cross-country skiing 

Men

Curling

Men's tournament

Team: Ulrik Schmidt (skip), Johnny Frederiksen, Bo Jensen, Lars Vilandt and Mikkel Poulsen (alternate).
Standings

Matches

Draw 1 16 Feb 9:00 PST 

Draw 3 17 Feb 14:00 PST 

Draw 4 18 Feb 9:00 PST 

Draw 5 18 Feb 19:00 PST 

Draw 6 19 Feb 14:00 PST 

Draw 7 20 Feb 9:00 PST 

Draw 9 21 Feb 14:00 PST 

Draw 11 22 Feb 19:00 PST 

Draw 12 23 Feb 14:00 PST

Women's tournament

Team: Angelina Jensen, Madeleine Dupont, Denise Dupont, Camilla Jensen and Ane Håkansson Hansen (alternate).
Standings

Matches

Draw 1 16 Feb 14:00 PST 

Draw 3 17 Feb 19:00 PST 

Draw 4 18 Feb 14:00 PST 

Draw 5 19 Feb 9:00 PST 

Draw 6 19 Feb 19:00 PST 

Draw 7 20 Feb 14:00 PST 

Draw 8 21 Feb 9:00 PST 

Draw 10 22 Feb 14:00 PST 

Draw 12 23 Feb 19:00 PST

Freestyle skiing 

Women

Snowboarding 

Women

Speed skating 

Women

See also
Denmark at the 2010 Winter Paralympics

References

External links
 Danish National Olympic Committee's official site

Nations at the 2010 Winter Olympics
2010 Winter Olympics
Winter Olympics